Costa Rica competed at the 1992 Summer Olympics in Barcelona, Spain. 16 competitors, 11 men and 5 women, took part in 18 events in 6 sports.

Competitors
The following is the list of number of competitors in the Games.

Archery

In its third archery competition at the Olympics, and first since 1980, Costa Rica entered a female archer for the first time.  She did not advance to the elimination rounds.

Women's Individual Competition:
 Patricia Obregon 
 Ranking round — 57th place (0-0)

Athletics

Men's 100m metres
Henry Daley Colphon 
 Heat — 11.11 (→ did not advance)

Men's 5,000 metres
José Luis Molina
 Heat — 14:09.22 (→ did not advance)

Men's 10,000 metres
Miguel Angel Vargas
 Heat — 30:13.06 (→ did not advance)

Men's Marathon
 Luis Lopez — 2:30.26 (→ 65th place)

Men's 400m Hurdles
Alex Foster
 Heat — 52.93 (→ did not advance, no ranking)

Women's Marathon
 Vilma Peña — 3:03.34 (→ 33rd place)

Canoeing

Men's Kayak Singles Slalom
 Joaquin García
 Ferdinand Steinvorth
 Gabriel Álvarez

Women's Kayak Singles Slalom
 Gilda Montenegro

Fencing

Men's sabre
 Esteban Mullins

Shooting

Mixed Skeet
 Alvaro Guardia

Swimming

Women's 100m Backstroke
 Silvia Poll
 Heat – 1:02.88
 B-Final – 1:03.57 (→ 15th place)

Women's 200m Backstroke
 Silvia Poll
 Heat – 2:11.66
 Final – 2:12.97 (→ 7th place)

See also
 Costa Rica at the 1991 Pan American Games

References

External links
Official Olympic Reports

Nations at the 1992 Summer Olympics
1992
Olympics